Kazachstania may refer to:
 Kazachstania (trilobite), an arthropod genus in the family Dalmanitidae
 Kazachstania (fungus), a yeast genus in the family Saccharomycetaceae

See also 
 Kazakhstania, a geological terrane, block or craton in Central Asia.